The 2019 Rogers Cup were outdoor hard court tennis tournaments played from August 5–11, 2019, as part of the 2019 US Open Series. It was the 130th edition of the men's Canadian Open, a Masters 1000 event on the 2019 ATP Tour at IGA Stadium in Montreal, and the 118th edition of the women's tournament, a Premier 5 event of the 2019 WTA Tour played at Aviva Centre in Toronto.

Points and prize money

Point distribution

Prize money

ATP singles main-draw entrants

Seeds
The following are the seeded players. Seedings are based on ATP rankings as of July 29, 2019. Rankings and points before are as of August 5, 2019.

† The player did not qualify for the tournament in 2018. Accordingly, points for his 18th best result are deducted instead.

Withdrawals 
The following players would have been seeded, but they withdrew from the event.

Other entrants
The following players received wild cards into the main singles draw:
  Peter Polansky
  Vasek Pospisil
  Brayden Schnur
  Jo-Wilfried Tsonga

The following player received entry as special exempt:
  Peter Gojowczyk

The following players received entry from the singles qualifying draw:
  Dan Evans 
  Ilya Ivashka 
  Bradley Klahn 
  Kwon Soon-woo 
  Feliciano López 
  Tommy Paul 
  Bernard Tomic

The following player received entry as an alternate:
  Hubert Hurkacz

The following player received entry as a lucky loser:
  John Millman

Withdrawals
Before the tournament
  Kevin Anderson → replaced by  Hubert Hurkacz
  Matteo Berrettini → replaced by  John Millman
  Pablo Cuevas → replaced by  Grigor Dimitrov
  Juan Martín del Potro → replaced by  Jordan Thompson
  Novak Djokovic → replaced by  Mikhail Kukushkin
  Roger Federer → replaced by  Richard Gasquet
  Frances Tiafoe → replaced by  Cameron Norrie
  Fernando Verdasco → replaced by  Márton Fucsovics

ATP doubles main-draw entrants

Seeds

 Rankings are as of July 29, 2019

Other entrants
The following pairs received wildcards into the doubles main draw:
  Félix Auger-Aliassime /   Vasek Pospisil
  Feliciano López /  Andy Murray
  Peter Polansky /  Brayden Schnur

WTA singles main-draw entrants

Seeds

 1 Rankings are as of July 29, 2019

Other entrants
The following players received wild cards into the main singles draw:
  Eugenie Bouchard 
  Leylah Annie Fernandez 
  Svetlana Kuznetsova
  Kristina Mladenovic
  Maria Sharapova

The following players received entry from the singles qualifying draw:
  Ekaterina Alexandrova 
  Marie Bouzková 
  Jennifer Brady 
  Francesca Di Lorenzo 
  Misaki Doi 
  Polona Hercog 
  Tatjana Maria 
  Anastasia Potapova 
  Alison Riske 
  Iga Świątek 
  Ajla Tomljanović 
  Wang Xiyu

The following player received entry as an alternate:
  Anastasia Pavlyuchenkova

The following player received entry as a lucky loser:
  Zhang Shuai

Withdrawals
Before the tournament
  Amanda Anisimova → replaced by  Anastasia Pavlyuchenkova
  Petra Kvitová → replaced by  Venus Williams
  Garbiñe Muguruza → replaced by  Zheng Saisai
  Lesia Tsurenko → replaced by  Zhang Shuai
  Wang Qiang → replaced by  Camila Giorgi
  Markéta Vondroušová → replaced by  Victoria Azarenka

Retirements
  Simona Halep (left lower leg injury)
  Tatjana Maria (left abdominal injury)
  Carla Suárez Navarro (right hip injury)
  Ajla Tomljanović (left abdominal injury)
  Serena Williams (upper back injury)

WTA doubles main-draw entrants

Seeds

 1 Rankings are as of July 29, 2019

Other entrants
The following pairs received wildcards into the doubles main draw:
  Françoise Abanda /   Carson Branstine
  Eugenie Bouchard /  Sharon Fichman
  Leylah Annie Fernandez /  Simona Halep

Retirements
  Yang Zhaoxuan (viral illness)

Finals

Men's singles

  Rafael Nadal defeated  Daniil Medvedev, 6–3, 6–0

Women's singles

  Bianca Andreescu defeated  Serena Williams, 3–1, retired

Men's doubles

  Marcel Granollers /  Horacio Zeballos defeated  Robin Haase /  Wesley Koolhof, 7–5, 7–5

Women's doubles

  Barbora Krejčíková /  Kateřina Siniaková defeated  Anna-Lena Grönefeld /  Demi Schuurs, 7–5, 6–0

References

External links
Official website - Men's tournament
Official website - Women's tournament

 
2019 ATP Tour
2019 WTA Tour
2019 in Canadian tennis
2019
August 2019 sports events in Canada